Dugesia notogaea is a species of dugesiid triclad that inhabits freshwater bodies of north Queensland, Australia.

Phylogeny
D. notogaea position in relation with other Dugesia species after the work of Lázaro et al., 2009:

References

External links

Dugesia notogaea in the Encyclopedia of Life

Notogaea
Animals described in 1998
Endemic fauna of Australia